Durrington & Salvington is an electoral division of West Sussex in England, and returns one member to sit on West Sussex County Council.

Extent
The division covers the neighbourhoods of Durrington and Salvington, which form part of the town of Worthing.

It falls entirely within the un-parished area of Worthing Borough and comprises the following borough wards: Durrington Ward and the southern part of Salvington Ward.

Election results

2013 Election
Results of the election held on 2 May 2013:

2009 Election
Results of the election held on 4 June 2009:

References
Election Results - West Sussex County Council

External links
 West Sussex County Council
 Election Maps

Electoral Divisions of West Sussex
Worthing